This is the results breakdown of the Sejm election held in Poland on 13 October 2019. The following tables show detailed results by each party in electoral coalitions, as well as constituency results.

Nationwide

Party breakdown

|- style="background-color:#C0DBFC; text-align:center;"
! colspan="3" style="text-align:left;" | Parties and coalitions
! Votes
! %
! Seats
|-
| rowspan="7" style="background-color:; border-bottom-style:hidden;" |
| style="background-color:;"|
| style="text-align:left;"| Law and Justice
| 6,516,252
| 35.29
| 187
|-
| style="background-color:;"|
| style="text-align:left;"| Independents
| 898,063
| 4.86
| 21
|-
| style="background-color:;"|
| style="text-align:left;"| Solidary Poland
| 331,467
| 1.79
| 10
|-
| style="background-color:;"|
| style="text-align:left;"| Agreement
| 291,506
| 1.58
| 16
|-
| style="background-color:#FF0000;"|
| style="text-align:left;"| Republican Party
| 9,972
| 0.05
| 1
|-
| style="background-color:#585858;"|
| style="text-align:left;"| Crossed out
| 3,300
| 0.02
| 0
|-
| style="background-color:#008000;"|
| style="text-align:left;"| Piast Faction
| 1,375
| 0.01
| 0
|- style="background-color:; color:white;"
| colspan="3" style="text-align:left;"| 
| 8,051,935
| 43.59
| 235
|-
| rowspan="12" style="background-color:; border-bottom-style:hidden;" |
| style="background-color:;"|
| style="text-align:left;"| Civic Platform
| 3,589,053
| 19.43
| 102
|-
| style="background-color:;"|
| style="text-align:left;"| Independents
| 936,658
| 5.07
| 19
|-
| style="background-color:;"|
| style="text-align:left;"| .Modern
| 315,209
| 1.71
| 8
|-
| style="background-color:;"|
| style="text-align:left;"| Polish Initiative
| 113,278
| 0.61
| 2
|-
| style="background-color:;"|
| style="text-align:left;"| The Greens
| 96,720
| 0.52
| 3
|-
| style="background-color:;"|
| style="text-align:left;"| Polish People's Party*
| 3,887
| 0.02
| 0
|-
| style="background-color:#004996;"|
| style="text-align:left;"| Silesian Regional Party
| 2,452
| 0.01
| 0
|-
| style="background-color:;"|
| style="text-align:left;"| Democratic Left Alliance*
| 1,156
| 0.01
| 0
|-
| style="background-color:;"|
| style="text-align:left;"| Social Democracy of Poland
| 896
| 0.00
| 0
|-
| style="background-color:;"|
| style="text-align:left;"| Your Movement
| 443
| 0.00
| 0
|-
| style="background-color:#FECC2F;"|
| style="text-align:left;"| Freedom and Equality
| 372
| 0.00
| 0
|-
| style="background-color:;"|
| style="text-align:left;"| Labour Union
| 231
| 0.00
| 0
|- style="background-color:; color:white;"
| colspan="3" style="text-align:left;"| 
| 5,060,355
| 27.40
| 134
|-
| rowspan="10" style="background-color:; border-bottom-style:hidden;" |
| style="background-color:;"|
| style="text-align:left;"| Democratic Left Alliance
| 873,450
| 4.73
| 23
|-
| style="background-color:;"|
| style="text-align:left;"| Left Together
| 509,318
| 2.76
| 6
|-
| style="background-color:;"|
| style="text-align:left;"| Spring
| 483,113
| 2.62
| 15
|-
| style="background-color:;"|
| style="text-align:left;"| Independents
| 443,331
| 2.40
| 5
|-
| style="background-color:;"|
| style="text-align:left;"| Your Movement
| 4,910
| 0.03
| 0
|-
| style="background-color:;"|
| style="text-align:left;"| Polish Socialist Party
| 2,798
| 0.02
| 0
|-
| style="background-color:#FF0000;"|
| style="text-align:left;"| Social Justice Movement
| 995
| 0.01
| 0
|-
| style="background-color:#CC0000;"|
| style="text-align:left;"| Polish Communist Party
| 819
| 0.00
| 0
|-
| style="background-color:;"|
| style="text-align:left;"| .Modern*
| 688
| 0.00
| 0
|-
| style="background-color:#014E97;"|
| style="text-align:left;"| Polish Internet Party
| 524
| 0.00
| 0
|- style="background-color:; color:white;"
| colspan="3" style="text-align:left;"| 
| 2,319,946
| 12.56
| 49
|-
| rowspan="9" style="background-color:; border-bottom-style:hidden;" |
| style="background-color:;"|
| style="text-align:left;"| Polish People's Party
| 972,339
| 5.26
| 19
|-
| style="background-color:;"|
| style="text-align:left;"| Independents
| 550,551
| 2.98
| 10
|-
| style="background-color:;"|
| style="text-align:left;"| Union of European Democrats
| 29,832
| 0.16
| 1
|-
| style="background-color:#F0D719;"|
| style="text-align:left;"| Silesians Together
| 17,836
| 0.10
| 0
|-
| style="background-color:#E73053;"|
| style="text-align:left;"| Poland Needs Us
| 4,053
| 0.02
| 0
|-
| style="background-color:;"|
| style="text-align:left;"| Alliance of Democrats
| 2,497
| 0.01
| 0
|-
| style="background-color:#FF0000;"|
| style="text-align:left;"| One-PL
| 977
| 0.01
| 0
|-
| style="background-color:;"|
| style="text-align:left;"| Civic Platform*
| 294
| 0.00
| 0
|-
| style="background-color:;"|
| style="text-align:left;"| League of Polish Families
| 144
| 0.00
| 0
|- style="background-color:; color:white;"
| colspan="3" style="text-align:left;"| 
| 1,578,523
| 8.55
| 30
|-
| rowspan="9" style="background-color:; border-bottom-style:hidden;" |
| style="background-color:;"|
| style="text-align:left;"| Independents
| 394,090
| 2.13
| 0
|-
| style="background-color:;"|
| style="text-align:left;"| National Movement
| 342,033
| 1.85
| 5
|-
| style="background-color:;"|
| style="text-align:left;"| KORWiN
| 286,873
| 1.55
| 3
|-
| style="background-color:;"|
| style="text-align:left;"| Confederation
| 214,731
| 1.16
| 3
|-
| style="background-color:#0087BD;"|
| style="text-align:left;"| Union of Christian Families
| 15,191
| 0.08
| 0
|-
| style="background-color:;"|
| style="text-align:left;"| League of Polish Families
| 1,731
| 0.01
| 0
|-
| style="background-color:#ED082C;"|
| style="text-align:left;"| Free and Solidary
| 1,017
| 0.01
| 0
|-
| style="background-color:#000000;"|
| style="text-align:left;"| National League
| 658
| 0.00
| 0
|-
| style="background-color:;"|
| style="text-align:left;"| Congress of the New Right
| 629
| 0.00
| 0
|- style="background-color:; color:white;"
| colspan="3" style="text-align:left;"| 
| 1,256,953
| 6.81
| 11
|-
| rowspan="5" style="background-color:; border-bottom-style:hidden;" |
| style="background-color:;"|
| style="text-align:left;"| Independents
| 143,861
| 0.78
| 0
|-
| style="background-color:;"|
| style="text-align:left;"| Law and Justice*
| 504
| 0.00
| 0
|-
| style="background-color:;"|
| style="text-align:left;"| Agreement*
| 255
| 0.00
| 0
|-
| style="background-color:;"|
| style="text-align:left;"| Polish People's Party*
| 102
| 0.00
| 0
|-
| style="background-color:#585858;"|
| style="text-align:left;"| Crossed out
| 51
| 0.00
| 0
|-
|- style="background-color:; color:white;"
| colspan="3" style="text-align:left;"| 
| 144,773
| 0.78
| 0
|-
| rowspan="2" style="background-color:; border-bottom-style:hidden;" |
| style="background-color:;"|
| style="text-align:left;"| Regional. Minority with Majority
| 17,423
| 0.09
| 1
|-
| style="background-color:;"|
| style="text-align:left;"| Independents
| 14,671
| 0.08
| 0
|- style="background-color:; color:white;"
| colspan="3" style="text-align:left;"| 
| 32,094
| 0.17
| 1
|-
| rowspan="6" style="background-color:; border-bottom-style:hidden;" |
| style="background-color:;"|
| style="text-align:left;"| Effective
| 8,582
| 0.05
| 0
|-
| style="background-color:;"|
| style="text-align:left;"| Independents
| 7,645
| 0.04
| 0
|-
| style="background-color:#ED082C;"|
| style="text-align:left;"| Free and Solidary
| 1,251
| 0.01
| 0
|-
| style="background-color:;"|
| style="text-align:left;"| Polish People's Party*
| 1,150
| 0.01
| 0
|-
| style="background-color:;"|
| style="text-align:left;"| KORWiN*
| 249
| 0.00
| 0
|-
| style="background-color:#BF1E2E;"|
| style="text-align:left;"| Unity of the Nation
| 41
| 0.00
| 0
|- style="background-color:; color:white;"
| colspan="3" style="text-align:left; color:white;"| Effective
| 18,918
| 0.10
| 0
|-
| rowspan="7" style="background-color:#25004F; border-bottom-style:hidden;" |
| style="background-color:;"|
| style="text-align:left;"| Independents
| 3,972
| 0.02
| 0
|-
| style="background-color:#25004F;"|
| style="text-align:left;"| Action of Disappointed Retirees and Pensioners
| 519
| 0.00
| 0
|-
| style="background-color:#C40109;"|
| style="text-align:left;"| Organization of the Polish Nation – Polish League
| 398
| 0.00
| 0
|-
| style="background-color:#2fa43a;"|
| style="text-align:left;"| PIAST – Unity of European Nations' Thought
| 236
| 0.00
| 0
|-
| style="background-color:;"|
| style="text-align:left;"| Self-Defence
| 217
| 0.00
| 0
|-
| style="background-color:#083A7F;"|
| style="text-align:left;"| Labour Faction
| 54
| 0.00
| 0
|-
| style="background-color:#ED082C;"|
| style="text-align:left;"| Free and Solidary
| 52
| 0.00
| 0
|- style="background-color:#25004F; color:white;"
| colspan="3" style="text-align:left; color:white;"| Action of Disappointed Retirees and Pensioners
| 5,448
| 0.03
| 0
|-
| rowspan="3" style="background-color:; border-bottom-style:hidden;" |
| style="background-color:;"|
| style="text-align:left;"| Congress of the New Right
| 775
| 0.00
| 0
|-
| style="background-color:;"|
| style="text-align:left;"| Independents
| 621
| 0.00
| 0
|-
| style="background-color:;"|
| style="text-align:left;"| Right Wing of the Republic
| 369
| 0.00
| 0
|- style="background-color:; color:white;"
| colspan="3" style="text-align:left;"| 
| 1,765
| 0.01
| 0
|-
| colspan="6" style="background-color:#E9E9E9;"| 
|- style="font-weight:bold;"
| colspan="3" style="text-align:left;"| Total
| 18,470,710
| 100
| 460
|-
| colspan="6" style="text-align:left;"| Source:
|}

* – individual members running on lists different from their own parties

Constituencies
Civic Coalition results compared to combined Civic Platform and Modern 2015 results.

Polish Coalition results compared to combined Polish People's Party and Kukiz'15 2015 results.

The Left results compared to combined United Left and Together 2015 results.

Confederation results compared to combined KORWiN and Committee of Grzegorz Braun "God Bless You!" 2015 results.

1st constituency (Legnica)

2nd constituency (Wałbrzych)

3rd constituency (Wrocław)

4th constituency (Bydgoszcz)

5th constituency (Toruń)

6th constituency (Lublin)

7th constituency (Chełm)

8th constituency (Zielona Góra)

9th constituency (Łódź)

10th constituency (Piotrków Trybunalski)

11th constituency (Sieradz)

12th constituency (Kraków I)

13th constituency (Kraków II)

14th constituency (Nowy Sącz)

15th constituency (Tarnów)

16th constituency (Płock)

17th constituency (Radom)

18th constituency (Siedlce)

19th constituency (Warszawa I)

Voters abroad and on ships

20th constituency (Warszawa II)

21st constituency (Opole)

22nd constituency (Krosno)

23rd constituency (Rzeszów)

24th constituency (Białystok)

25th constituency (Gdańsk)

26th constituency (Słupsk)

27th constituency (Bielsko-Biała I)

28th constituency (Częstochowa)

29th constituency (Katowice I)

30th constituency (Bielsko-Biała II)

31st constituency (Katowice II)

32nd constituency (Katowice III)

33rd constituency (Kielce)

34th constituency (Elbląg)

35th constituency (Olsztyn)

36th constituency (Kalisz)

37th constituency (Konin)

38th constituency (Piła)

39th constituency (Poznań)

40th constituency (Koszalin)

41st constituency (Szczecin)

Notes

References

Parliamentary election breakdown (Sejm)